The First Presbyterian Church is a historic church at 213 Whittington Avenue in Hot Springs, Arkansas.  It is a large stone building,  designed by Charles L. Thompson in Late Gothic Revival style and built in 1907.  It has a square tower with pronounced buttressing at the corners set on the right side of its front facade, and a lower tower at the left side, with a gabled entry section at the center.  The entrance is set in a broad lancet-arched opening, and is topped in the gable by a three-part stained glass window.  The main sanctuary space is set perpendicular to the main facade, with a large stained glass window set in a recessed round-arch panel at the end. An entrance into the tunnels underneath hot springs is also located here.

The church was listed on the National Register of Historic Places in 1982.

See also
National Register of Historic Places listings in Garland County, Arkansas

References

Churches on the National Register of Historic Places in Arkansas
Gothic Revival church buildings in Arkansas
Churches completed in 1907
Churches in Garland County, Arkansas
Buildings and structures in Hot Springs, Arkansas
National Register of Historic Places in Hot Springs, Arkansas